Don't Look Back is a 1980 album by American singer Natalie Cole. Released on May 15, 1980 by Capitol Records, The album reached peak positions of number 77 on the Billboard 200; number 17 on Billboard R&B Albums chart.

The album spawned one Top 40 single, "Someone That I Used to Love," which reached number 21 on the U.S. Billboard Hot 100 and spent five months on the charts.  It also peaked at number three on the Adult Contemporary chart.

Track listing
 "Don't Look Back" (Fred Allen, Marvin Yancy, Natalie Cole) - 4:08
 "(I've Seen) Paradise" (Marvin Yancy, Natalie Cole) - 4:31
 "Hold On" (Kevin Yancy, Marvin Yancy, Natalie Cole) - 4:50
 "Stairway to the Stars" (Frank Signorelli, Matty Malneck, Mitchell Parish) - 3:08
 "I'm Getting Into You" (Chuck Bynum, Marvin Yancy, Natalie Cole) - 3:57
 "Someone That I Used to Love" (Gerry Goffin, Michael Masser) - 4:05
 "Danger Up Ahead" (Natalie Cole) - 6:30
 "Beautiful Dreamer" (Natalie Cole) - 4:10
 "Cole Blooded" (Gene Barge, Natalie Cole) - 4:56

Personnel 

 Natalie Cole – lead vocals, keyboards (8), rhythm arrangements (8)
 Linda Williams – keyboards (1, 2, 3, 7), acoustic piano (5)
 Marvin Yancy – keyboards (1, 2, 3, 7, 9), rhythm arrangements (1, 2, 3, 5)
 Michael Masser – keyboards (6), rhythm arrangements (6)
 Chuck Brynum – guitars (1, 5, 9), rhythm arrangements (5)
 Michael Clinco – guitars (4)
 Steve Hunter – guitars (7)
 Larry Ball – bass (1-5, 7, 8, 9), rhythm arrangements (7)
 Leland Sklar – bass (6)
 James Gadson – drums (1, 2, 3, 5, 7, 8, 9)
 Norm Jeffries – drums (4)
 Rick Shlosser – drums (6)
 Jackie Kelso – alto saxophone (4)
 Marshall Royal – alto saxophone (4)
 Bill Green – baritone saxophone (4)
 Curtis Amy – tenor saxophone (4)
 Ernie Watts – tenor saxophone (4)
 George Bohanon – trombone (4)
 Garnett Brown – trombone (4)
 Chris Riddle – trombone (4)
 Oscar Brashear – trumpet (4)
 Bobby Bryant – trumpet (4)
 Chuck Findley – trumpet (4)
 Gene Barge – arrangements (1, 2, 3, 5, 7, 8, 9), rhythm arrangements (1, 2, 3, 9), alto sax solo (3)
 Nelson Riddle – arrangements (4)
 John Fresco – music contractor (4)
 Lee Holdridge – orchestral arrangements (6)
 Anita Anderson – backing vocals 
 The Colettes – backing vocals
 The "N" Sisters – backing vocals

Production 
 Producers – Gene Barge and Marvin Yancy (Tracks 1-6, 8 & 9); Michael Masser (Track 7).
 Assistant Producer – Chuck Brynum 
 Engineers – Gerry E. Brown (Tracks 1, 2, 3 & 5-9); Paul Dobbe (Track 4).
 Assistant Engineers – Reggie Dozier, Jerry Hall and Rick Surber (Tracks 1, 2, 3 & 5-9); David Ahlert (Track 4).
 Remixing – Gerry E. Brown
 Mastered by Wally Traugott at Capitol Studios (Hollywood, CA).
 Art Direction and Design – Glen Christensen
 Photography – Vincent Hughes Frye and Georgina Karvellas

Charts

References

1980 albums
Albums arranged by Nelson Riddle
Albums arranged by Lee Holdridge
Albums produced by Michael Masser
Capitol Records albums
Natalie Cole albums